Zacorisca toxopei is a species of moth of the family Tortricidae. It is found on New Guinea and Borneo.

Subspecies
Zacorisca toxopei toxopei
Zacorisca toxopei aplasta Diakonoff, 1948 (Borneo)

References

	

Moths described in 1948
Zacorisca